Lucito is a comune (municipality) in the Province of Campobasso in the Italian region Molise, located about  north of Campobasso.

Lucito borders the following municipalities: Castelbottaccio, Castellino del Biferno, Civitacampomarano, Limosano, Morrone del Sannio, Petrella Tifernina, Sant'Angelo Limosano, Trivento.

References

Cities and towns in Molise